John Aloysius Farrell is an American author and historian. He has written biographies of U.S. President Richard Nixon, Senator Ted Kennedy, House Speaker Thomas "Tip" O'Neill, and defense attorney Clarence Darrow. He is a former White House correspondent and Washington editor for The Boston Globe and a former Washington bureau chief and columnist for The Denver Post.

On January 2, 2017, The New York Times reported that Farrell had unearthed notes written by Nixon aide H.R. Haldeman, which confirmed that Nixon personally authorized "throwing a monkey wrench" into Lyndon Johnson's attempts to negotiate peace in Vietnam on the eve of the 1968 election. In his famous interviews with newsman David Frost, and elsewhere, Nixon had always denied any participation in what history has come to call the Chennault Affair - after Anna Chennault, the Nixon campaign's go-between with South Vietnam.  Farrell's discovery earned praise from his peers.

On April 16, 2018 the Pulitzer Prize board announced that Richard Nixon: The Life was a finalist for the 2018 Pulitzer Prize in Biography.

On April 13, 2018, the New-York Historical Society awarded Farrell the title of "American Historian Laureate," and presented him with the $50,000 Barbara and David Zalaznick Book Prize in American History for Richard Nixon: The Life.

Life

Born in Huntington, New York, Farrell graduated from the University of Virginia in 1975 before working at newspapers in Montgomery County, Maryland, Annapolis and Baltimore. While at the Globe, he also worked as an investigative reporter on the vaunted "Spotlight" investigative unit. He has a PhD in history from the University of Groningen in the Netherlands.

Excerpts of his work have been published in Jack Beatty's collection Pols: Great Writers on American Politicians from Bryan to Reagan, and in Leadership for the Public Service by Richard A. Loverd. Farrell was a contributor, as well, to The Boston Globe's 2004 biography of United States Senator from Massachusetts John Kerry.

Farrell is an on-camera commentator in the PBS American Experience documentaries "Jimmy Carter" and "The Perfect Crime," a study of the Leopold and Loeb thrill-killers case, and in the television series The Irish in America.

Journalistic awards and honors
George Polk Award, 1984, for investigative reporting of deaths caused by malfunctioning medical devices, (List of George Polk Award winners) as part of a team at The Denver Post
Gerald R. Ford Prize, 1996, for coverage of the American Presidency https://geraldrfordfoundation.org/past-reporting-prize-recipients/ for The Boston Globe
Aldo Beckman Memorial Award, 1996, for coverage of the American Presidency for The Boston Globe
Raymond Clapper Award, 2001, for reporting in The Boston Globe on flaws in the criminal justice system that lead to the conviction of innocent defendants

Works

Footnotes

External links
 
 

The Denver Post people
Living people
Year of birth missing (living people)